EP is an EP by Luna, released in 1996 by No. 6 Records. It consists of outtakes from the band's third album Penthouse.

Track listing
(all songs by Dean Wareham, except where noted)
 "Sideshow By the Seashore"  – 3:14
 "Thank You For Sending Me An Angel"  – 2:06 (Talking Heads)
 "The Moviegoer"  – 4:59
 "It's Bringing You Down"  – 2:14
 "The Enabler"  – 5:06
 "No Regrets"  – 3:43 (Tom Rush)

Personnel
Luna
 Dean Wareham – vocals, guitars
 Sean Eden – guitar
 Justin Harwood – gass
 Stanley Demeski – drums, percussion

Production
 Recorded by Mario Salvati, Pat McCarthy and Patrick Derivaz

References

Luna (1990s American band) albums
1996 EPs